The arms of Dresden first appeared on the seal of the city in 1309.  The seal may pre-date the oldest existing documents about Dresden from the early 13th century. The arms that depict the lion of Meissen and the pales of Landsberg have ever since been used by the city. The original pales were probably blue, but were later converted to black. From the 16th century the arms were furnished with a helmet and mantling, but these fell in disuse at the beginning to the twentieth century.

Blazon
Party per pale on a golden shield showing a black lion to dexter and two black pales to sinister. The lion is looking to dexter and has a red tongue. The city's colours are derivatively black and yellow (Or).

Meaning
The lion represents the Margraviate of Meissen and the pales called the Landsberger Pfähle represent the March of Landsberg, both ruling the city of Dresden.

The coat of arms of Leipzig is very similar but has blue pales.

References

Further reading
 Bensing et al. Lexikon Städte und Wappen der DDR. Leipzig. 1984.
 Gunnar Staack. Flaggen Deutscher Städte (Flags of German Cities). Germany: Deutsche Gesellschaft für Flaggenkunde e.V. 1997.

External links
 City of Dresden (Saxony, Germany)
 Wappen der Stadt Dresden, 1940

Dresden
Dresden
Dresden